Hanns Theodor Wilhelm Freiherr von Gumppenberg (4 December 1866 – 29 March 1928) was a German poet, translator, cabaret artist and theatre critic. He used the pseudonyms Jodok and Professor Immanuel Tiefbohrer.

Life 
Gumppenberg was born in 1866 in Landshut, the son of Karl Freiherr von Gumppenberg (1833–1893), a postal clerk from Bamberg and a scion of the original Bavarian noble family of Reichsfreiherren von Gumppenberg. His mother was Engelberta von Gumppenberg, née Sommer (1839–1920), daughter of a geographer.

Both the father and already the grandfather  (Bavarian member of parliament, landowner and major) were active in literature. The father wrote mostly dialectal drama and poetry, the grandfather belletristic works and witty Punch and Judy plays.

After the page school and the Abitur at the Wilhelmsgymnasium München he took up studies in philosophy and literary history in Munich in 1885. For reasons of better livelihood, however, Gumppenberg decided three years later to take up legal studies. He eventually abandoned law studies to work as a freelance writer and journalist. In 1894, he married Charlotte Donnerstag (born 1870) in Berlin, who died in 1895.

Gumppenberg was theatre critic of the Münchner Neueste Nachrichten from 1901 to 1909. From 1910 to 1913, together with Alfred Auscher, he was editor of the new artistic-literary journal Light and Shadow. Wochenschrift für Schwarz-Weiß-Kunst und Dichtung. Afterwards he worked as an author and editor for the magazine Jugend until his death. From 1902 onwards, Gumppenberg also regularly worked as a translator of foreign poetry, for example Swedish poems by Bellman, Fröding and Karlfeldt.

After 1889, Gumppenberg moved in the circles of the Munich modernists, to which Michael Georg Conrad and his followers belonged first and foremost. Ein Sammelbuch der Münchner Modernen With contributions by Otto Julius Bierbaum, Julius Brand, M. G. Conrad, Anna Croissant-Rust, Hanns von Gumppenberg, Oskar Panizza, Ludwig Scharf, Georg Schaumberger, R. v. Seydlitz Fr. Wedekind. 1st series, Munich 1891. on the cultivation and dissemination of modern creative spirit in all fields: Social life, literature, art and science"</ref> In 1897, he married Helene Bondy (1868–1954), the daughter of the factory owner Ignaz Bondy and the Austrian women's rights activist Ottilie Bondy, in his second marriage.

In 1901, under the pseudonym Jodok, he became a co-founder of the Munich cabaret  as a writer of poetry and drama parodies. His parodistic work also eventually made him famous. Gumppenberg's collection of parodies Das Teutsche Dichterross, 1st edition 1901, went through a total of 14 editions. However, he remained unsuccessful with the main part of his work – mostly worldview and idea dramas.

The First World War and inflation brought Gumppenberg into financial difficulties and from 1922 he was also in poor health. On 29 March 1928 he died in Munich of a heart condition at the age of 61.

Gumppenberg's estate is housed in the Monacensia literary archive of the city of Munich.

 Work 
 Thorwald. (Trauerspiel) München, 1888
 Apollo. (comedy) J. Lindauer, München 1890
 Das dritte Testament – Eine Offenbarung Gottes. Poesse, Munich 1891
Deutsche Lyrik von Gestern
 Kritik des Wirklich-Seienden – Grundlagen zu einer Philosophie des Wirklich-Seienden. Verlagsabtheilung der deutschen Schriftstellergenossenschaft, Berlin 1892
 Alles und Nichts – Dichtung in 3 Abtheilungen und 12 Bildern. Baumert & Ronge, Großenhain und Leipzig: 1894
 Die Minnekönigin. (comedy) Reclam, Leipzig 1894
 Der fünfte Prophet. (novel) Verlag f. Deutsches Schriftthum, Berlin 1895
 Der erste Hofnarr. (Schauspiel) Baumert & Ronge, Großenhain und Leipzig 1899
 Das Teutsche Dichterross in allen Gangarten vorgeritten. (Parody) Verl. der Deutsch-Französischen Rundschau, Munich 1901.
 Die Verdammten. (Schauspiel) E. Bloch, Berlin 1901
 (Jodok) Der Veterinärarzt – Mystodrama in einem Aufzug. in "Die elf Scharfrichter". Vo. 1, . Schuster und Loeffler, Berlin 1901
 (Jodok) Der Nachbar – Monodrama in einem Satz. in "Die elf Scharfrichter". Vol. 1, . Schuster und Loeffler, Berlin 1901
 (Jodok) Überdramen (Parodies, 3 volumes.) Th. Mayhofer Nachf., Berlin 1902
 Die Einzige. (tragicomedy) Callwey, Munich 1903
 Grundlagen der wissenschaftlichen Philosophie. Callwey, Munich 1903
 König Konrad I. (geschichtliches Schauspiel) Callwey, Munich 1904
 König Heinrich I. (geschichtliches Schauspiel) Callwey, Munich 1904
 Herzog Philipps Brautfahrt. (Opernlustspiel) Callwey, Munich 1904
 Aus meinem lyrischen Tagebuch. Callwey, Munich 1906
 Bellman-Brevier – Aus Fredmans Episteln und Liedern, Deutsch von Hanns von Gumppenberg, Verlag von Albert Langen, Munich 1909
 Beweis des Großen Fermat'schen Satzes für alle ungeraden Exponenten. Callwey, Munich 1913
 Schauen und Sinnen. (poetry) G. Müller, Munich 1913
 Schaurige Schicksale, fälschende Fama und leere Lorbeeren – Dokumentarisches über meine Bühnenwerke. Callwey, Munich 1914
 Der Pinsel Yings. (comedy) Callwey, Munich 1914
 Philosophie und Okkultismus. Rösl, Munich 1921
 Das Teutsche Dichterross in allen Gangarten vorgeritten. (Parodies) 13. u. 14. erw. Aufl. Callwey, München 1929
 Lebenserinnerungen. Aus dem Nachlass. Eigenbrödler Verlag, Berlin 1930

 References 

 Source 
 

 External links 

 
 Erlanger Liste (Texte)
 Nachlass in der Monacensia
 Die Gedichte on zgedichte.de
 Hanns von Gumppenberg im Literaturportal Bayern
 Gumppenberg als Paul Verlaine-Übersetzer: Meine Spitäler''.Insel-Verlag, Leipzig, in Project Gutenberg
 
 

19th-century German writers
20th-century German writers
German theatre critics
19th-century German poets
19th-century German male writers
20th-century German poets
German male poets
Barons of Germany
1866 births
1928 deaths
People from Landshut
20th-century German male writers